Wilmington is a city in and the county seat of Clinton County, Ohio, United States. The population was 12,660 at the 2020 census. At city entrances from state routes, county roads, and U.S. highways, the city slogan of "We Honor Our Champions" is seen, accompanied by signs that highlight various athletic accomplishments from Wilmington individuals and teams. The city features a weather forecast office of the National Weather Service, which serves all of Southwestern Ohio and portions of Kentucky and Indiana.

Wilmington was featured in Time magazine on December 8, 1997 as a small town that is attractive to suburban families. The city was also showcased in a 1995 publication titled The 100 Best Small Towns in America. Home to Wilmington College, founded in 1870 by the Society of Friends, the city and the surrounding area include more than one dozen Quaker meeting houses.

History
The town of Clinton was founded in 1810 as seat of the newly formed Clinton County; the name was changed to Wilmington in 1811. The village was incorporated in 1828.

In 1833, Wilmington contained a brick courthouse, a jail, fourteen stores, two taverns, two groceries, four churches, and 100 residential houses.

Geography
Wilmington is located at  (39.445913, -83.829128).

Climate

Demographics

2010 census
As of the census of 2010, there were 12,520 people, 5,072 households, and 2,995 families residing in the city. The racial makeup of the city was 88.3% White, 6.1% African American, 0.2% Native American, 0.8% Asian, 0.1% Pacific Islander, 0.9% from other races, and 3.5% from two or more races. Hispanic or Latino of any race were 2.6% of the population.

There were 5,072 households, of which 31.6% had children under the age of 18 living with them, 37.8% were married couples living together, 16.3% had a female householder with no husband present, 4.9% had a male householder with no wife present, and 41.0% were non-families. 35.3% of all households were made up of individuals, and 15% had someone living alone who was 65 years of age or older. The average household size was 2.27 and the average family size was 2.92.

The median age in the city was 33.7 years. 23.5% of residents were under the age of 18; 14.8% were between the ages of 18 and 24; 24.2% were from 25 to 44; 23% were from 45 to 64; and 14.5% were 65 years of age or older. The gender makeup of the city was 46.7% male and 53.3% female.

2000 census
As of the census of 2000, there were 11,921 people, 4,867 households, and 2,929 families residing in the city. The population density was 1,599.9 people per square mile (617.8/km2). There were 5,284 housing units at an average density of 709.2 per square mile (273.8/km2). The racial makeup of the city was 90.66% White, 6.72% African American, 0.23% Native American, 0.65% Asian, 0.01% Pacific Islander, 0.25% from other races, and 1.49% from two or more races. Hispanic or Latino of any race were 0.84% of the population.

There were 4,867 households, out of which 30.1% had children under the age of 18 living with them, 42.7% were married couples living together, 13.7% had a female householder with no husband present, and 39.8% were non-families. 33.7% of all households were made up of individuals, and 13.4% had someone living alone who was 65 years of age or older. The average household size was 2.28 and the average family size was 2.92.

In the city the population was spread out, with 23.7% under the age of 18, 15.8% from 18 to 24, 27.3% from 25 to 44, 19.2% from 45 to 64, and 14.1% who were 65 years of age or older. The median age was 32 years. For every 100 females, there were 89.9 males. For every 100 females age 18 and over, there were 84.4 males.

The median income for a household in the city was $34,880, and the median income for a family was $43,619. Males had a median income of $31,645 versus $22,627 for females. The per capita income for the city was $17,346. About 8.9% of families and 11.7% of the population were below the poverty line, including 14.6% of those under age 18 and 10.5% of those age 65 or over.

Economy and business
In the early 1950s the city became home to a number of U.S. Department of Defense facilities, most notably the Clinton County Air Force Base. Following its closure in 1971, the economy of the city hovered in recession for more than a decade. After a number of small attempts to reuse the abandoned air force base, Airborne Express purchased the facility in 1979 for $850,000, a fraction of the estimated $100 million spent to construct it. During the next 24 years, Airborne invested more than $250 million to build a hub for its national delivery network, including new sort centers, a  runway, aircraft hangars, machine shops, flight simulators, a state of art control tower, and a modern administration building to accommodate an estimated 6,000 employees and its fleet of 125 DC-8, DC-9 and Boeing 767 aircraft.

In 2003, Airborne Express reorganized and ABX Air, Inc. was created. ABX Air is a contract freight forwarding business whose primary customer is DHL, one of the world's largest international shipping firms. ABX's parent company, Air Transport Services Group, is based in Wilmington. Owned by the Deutsche Post WorldNet, a German holding company, DHL consolidated its US flight and sorting hub operations in Wilmington in 2005. Restructuring in May 2008 resulted in eight thousand layoffs, and six months later the Wilmington hub was closed, resulting in another eight thousand layoffs.

The facility closed in July 2009, and DHL moved to a much smaller sorting operation at the Cincinnati-Northern Kentucky International Airport. Wilmington's airport hosts a comparatively smaller Maintenance Repair and Overhaul venture, along with Airborne Maintenance and Engineering Services, employing several hundred employees under the auspices of the ABX Air parent company, ATSG (Air Transport Services Group).

On July 16, 2009, the Wilmington City Council voted unanimously to establish Wilmington as a "Green Enterprise Zone". The legislation will facilitate green economic development by creating financial incentives for the creation of green collar jobs. The City Council passed the measure in response to an economic grassroots movement initiated in October 2008 by two Wilmington High School graduates, Mark Rembert and Taylor Stuckert, aided by Pure Blue Energy, LLC a consulting firm out of North Carolina. Wilmington is the first city in the United States to pass such a law.

The AZEK Company has main flagship manufacturing plant located in Wilmington, which produces composite decking and railing systems under brand TimberTech & AZEK. With this Green Enterprise Zone initiatives in place, AZEK company in 2018 opened state-of-the-art Polyethylene recycling plant in Wilmington Airpark which recycles post-industrial and post-consumer polyethylene and makes it into raw material for TimberTech decking.

Wilmington is also home to CMH Regional Health System, a regional health provider. From its base of operations at Clinton Memorial Hospital, the non-profit corporation has established health clinics in almost a dozen satellite locations in Southwestern Ohio. In 2007, CMH opened the Foster J. Boyd, MD, Regional Cancer Center in Wilmington, providing cancer treatment services for patients throughout Southwest Ohio. The hospital in Wilmington has 95 staffed beds, and employed nearly 1000 people as of fiscal year 2006. The hospital also offers a six-bed Intensive Care Unit, a dedicated Emergency Room (with an average of over 30,000 visits from 2004–2006), an Obstetrics Unit (with 725 births in FY 2006), Surgical services (6,356 surgical procedures and 1,184 endoscopies FY 2006), Medical-Telemetry care, Medical-Surgical and Pediatric care, Physical Rehabilitation, Nuclear Medicine and CT services, and a Sleep Study center, amongst other various professional services at the hospital. RegionalCare Hospital Partners of Brentwood, Tennessee, purchased Clinton Memorial Hospital on November 30, 2010. The total sale price after adjustments was $82,137,477.

In addition to air freight services and medical services, the city of Wilmington also competes in the truck freight industry, serving as corporate home to R+L Carriers, a trucking and shipping company located off of the intersection between U.S. 68 and I-71 north of Wilmington.

Education
The Wilmington City Schools system includes Roy E. Holmes Elementary, Denver Place Elementary, East End Elementary, as well as Rodger O. Borror Middle School (formerly known as Wilmington Middle School) and Wilmington High School. The school district includes , and is the largest in the county. ACT scores are above both the state and national averages, and over three quarter of students go on to attend college, which is far above the state average of 40% although both are the lowest among the four high schools within the county.

In addition, two college campuses are located in the city. Southern State Community College operates its North Campus in Wilmington, with other campuses in Washington Court House, Hillsboro, and Sardinia, with primary focus on transfer credits and health sciences, such as Nursing and Medical Assisting and Respiratory Therapy, as well as a Practical Nursing.

Most notable is the campus of Wilmington College, a Quaker established college that dates from the nineteenth century, which focuses on liberal arts education with themes of global peace and understanding and majors in agriculture, education, athletic training, and small business.

The city is served by one of two branches of the Wilmington Public Library system.

Media
The city and surrounding areas are served by a daily newspaper published in Wilmington, the News Journal, and by two radio stations.
WALH-LP 106.7 FM (local programming, information and oldies music)
WKFI 1090 AM (simulcast of WBZI)

Transportation

The city lies approximately 35 miles southeast of Dayton, 50 miles northeast of Cincinnati and 60 miles southwest of Columbus at the nexus of several routes that traverse Southwest Ohio. Wilmington is served by US Route 68, US Route 22/State Route 3, State Route 73, State Route 134 and State Route 730. The city does not have direct interstate access but is connected to Interstate 71 via US Route 68 and State Route 73.

Airborne Airpark serves as the city's airport. The airport sees substantial domestic and international cargo service but is not currently served by any commercial passenger services.

Freight railroad service is provided by the Indiana and Ohio Railway on a line owned by CSX Transportation between Cincinnati and Columbus.

Culture and recreation
Wilmington is situated within one hour driving distance to Dayton, Cincinnati, and Columbus. In the mid 1990s, the annual Banana Split Festival was started to commemorate the town's alleged creation of the famous treat in Wilmington in 1907. In addition, each year the city hosts the Clinton County Corn Festival, which pays homage to the agricultural tradition of the county. In 2007, a new festival, the Hometown Holidazzle, was started, taking place in the late fall. Aside from the annual events, Wilmington played host to a festival each year that a new Harry Potter book was released. Thousands would gather in downtown Wilmington at the Books 'N' More bookstore and surrounding businesses to celebrate each release.

Located in the downtown business district is the historic Murphy Theatre, which can be seen in the film Lost In Yonkers, part of which was filmed in the city in the early 1990s. It is also the setting of Michael Moore's 2016 documentary film, Michael Moore in TrumpLand. The Murphy Theater stages productions throughout the year from various acts and ensembles as well as staging musicals and plays from neighboring school districts in the county. More recently, the Murphy is home to free screenings of classic movies, sponsored by a community group. The Murphy Theatre saw the marriage of actor John Ritter and wife Amy Yasbeck on September 18, 1999, with the marquee simply stating "Congratulations John and Amy." Nearby in downtown Wilmington is the historic General Denver Hotel, which is named in honor of General James W. Denver, founder of the city of Denver, Colorado. General James Denver is also buried in Wilmington.

NCAA sports

Wilmington is home to Wilmington College, a member of the Ohio Athletic Conference and participant in NCAA Division III sports. In 2004, the Wilmington College women's basketball team won the NCAA Women's Division III Basketball Championship, the most prestigious national title won by a Wilmington sport team.

In the summer of 2008, the Quakers football home, Williams Stadium, underwent a major renovation, with new stadium lights and artificial playing field installed.

Notable people
 Kroger Babb, film and TV producer
 Andrea Bowers, artist
 Michael Bray, anti-abortion activist and author
 James W. Denver, soldier, politician, and lawyer for whom Denver, Colorado is named
 James Henry Garland, Roman Catholic bishop
 Stephanie Hodge, actress
 Clarence Jones, jazz pianist and composer
 Charles Murphy, former owner of the Chicago Cubs
 Quinten Rollins, NFL Football Player for the Green Bay Packers
 Cliff Rosenberger, Ohio House of Representatives, 102nd Speaker of the House
 Gary Sandy, actor
 Charles B. Timberlake, U.S. Representative from Colorado
 Norris Turney, jazz musician 
 Michael Wilson, NFL and CFL football offensive lineman

Gallery

References

Further reading

External links

 Official website
 Banana Split Festival - Wilmington
 Clinton Memorial Hospital
 Wilmington City Schools
 Wilmington / Clinton County Chamber of Commerce
 Wilmington Public Library
 Wilmington News Journal
 National Weather Service Wilmington
 Press release announcing Chamberlain's participation in Clash of the Choirs
 Wilmington College
 Watson Library at Wilmington College

Cities in Clinton County, Ohio
County seats in Ohio
Populated places established in 1810
Cities in Ohio